Estela Pérez Somarriba is a Spanish tennis player. She competes on the ITF Women's Circuit and at the University of Miami.

Early years
Perez-Somarriba was born to Felipe Perez-Somarriba and Maria Jose Yravedra on July 25, 1998 and grew up in Madrid, Spain. She attended high school at Instituto Mirasierra in Madrid.

College
Perez-Somarriba could easily have turned pro after high school, but she chose to continue her tennis career at a college, and one across the Atlantic in Florida, at the University of Miami. Although the decision was not an easy one, it has paid off. As an unseeded freshman, she made it to the semi-finals of the 2017 NCAA Division I Tennis Championships in the singles division, only to fall to Belinda Woolcock. She made it to the Sweet Sixteen as a sophomore; her NCAA single record stands at 12–2.

She reached the finals of the NCAA Division I Women's Tennis Championship in the 2019 singles category, and won the event, defeating Katarina Jokić.

Perez-Somarriba, who has been named the top tennis player in the ACC the last two years, has also won more singles matches than anyone else in NCAA Division I this year, with a record of 43–5. She is the second Hurricanes woman  to win the national title; Audra Cohen won the title in 2007. Her potential defense of her title in the spring of 2020 as interrupted by the Covid-19 event, which disrupted the conclusion of winter sports seasons, and all spring sports.  However, the NCA has permitted schools to off seniors and additional year of eligibility. Miami made that offer, and Perez-Somarriba became the first Miami athlete to accept the offer, so she will continue her studies as a graduate student, and compete on the tennis team in 2021. She will also be able to compete as a professional and the NCAA does allow "...college athletes to participate in professional tournaments as long as the athletes adhere to the strict rules regarding agents and prize money...".

She was named the winner of the Honda Sports Award as the nation's best collegiate female tennis player in 2019.

ITF finals

Doubles: 2 (2 runner–ups)

References

External links
 
 

Living people
Miami Hurricanes women's tennis players
Spanish female tennis players
1998 births
Tennis players from Madrid